Shëndre (romanized: Ágios Andréas) is a small village in Vlorë County, southern Albania. At the 2015 local government reform it became part of the municipality of Finiq. It is inhabited solely by Greeks. The name of the village in both languages means "Saint Andrew".

Demographics 
According to Ottoman statistics, the village had 263 inhabitants in 1895. The village had 446 inhabitants in 1993, all ethnically Greeks.

References

External links 
Video showing the village
Celebration of the Resurrection of Jesus in Agios Andreas, 2015

Villages in Vlorë County
Greek communities in Albania